Teofila (and its variant Teófila) is a feminine given name of Spanish origin. Notable people with the name are as follows:

Teofila Băiașu (born 1927), Romanian gymnast
Teofila Bogumiła Glińska (died 1799), Polish poet
Teofila Chmielecka (1590–1650), wife of Polish noble Stefan Chmielecki
Teofila Działyńska (Szołdrska-Potulicka) (1714-1790), Polish landowner
Teofila Fedorovna Romanovich (1842–1924), Ukrainian stage actress and theatre director
Teófila Márquiz (born 1932), Venezuelan fencer
Teófila Martínez (born 1948), Spanish politician
Teofila Radziwiłł (fl. 1781), Polish noblewoman and Freemason
Teofila Zofia Sobieska (1607–1661), Polish noblewoman 
Teofila Ludwika Zasławska (c. 1650–1709), Polish noblewoman  

Polish feminine given names
Romanian feminine given names
Spanish feminine given names
Ukrainian feminine given names